Fish My City is a six part television series by Nat Geo Wild. It is hosted by Michael Iaconelli and documents urban fishing in various locations throughout the world.

References 

National Geographic (American TV channel) original programming
2010s American documentary television series
2018 American television series debuts